Citharinus congicus is a species of lutefish from tropical Africa.
It reaches a length of 43 cm.

Distribution
The species is found in Africa. It is present in the Congo basin from the lower Congo to Lake Upemba in the Democratic Republic of the Congo and the Republic of Congo, as well as in the Rufiji-Ruaha in Tanzania.

References

Daget, J., 1984. Citharinidae. p. 212-216. In J. Daget, J.-P. Gosse and D.F.E. Thys van den Audenaerde (eds.) Check-list of the freshwater fishes of Africa (CLOFFA). ORSTOM, Paris and MRAC, Tervuren. Vol. 1.

Characiformes
Fish of Africa
Taxa named by George Albert Boulenger
Fish described in 1897